Charles Augustus Kennedy (March 24, 1869 – January 10, 1951) was a seven-term Republican U.S. Representative from Iowa's 1st congressional district in southeastern Iowa.

Biography
Born in Montrose, Iowa, Kennedy completed preparatory studies.  He was interested in horticultural pursuits and later engaged in business as a nurseryman.  He served as mayor of Montrose from 1890 to 1895.  He served as member of the Iowa House of Representatives for one two-year term between 1903 and 1905.

In 1906, Kennedy was elected as a Republican to the Sixtieth Congress. At the time of his nomination, his political philosophy was described as "strongly standpat," a reference to the "stand-patters" faction of the Republican Party that provided a conservative alternative to the Party's progressive wing. He was re-elected six times, before choosing not to run for re-election in 1920.  
He served as chairman of the Committee on Mileage (in the Sixtieth and Sixty-first Congresses), and the Committee on Rivers and Harbors (in the Sixty-sixth Congress).  In all, he served from March 4, 1907 to March 3, 1921.

He engaged in banking until his retirement.  He died in Montrose on January 10, 1951.  He was interred in Montrose Cemetery.

References

1869 births
1951 deaths
Mayors of places in Iowa
Republican Party members of the Iowa House of Representatives
American horticulture businesspeople
Republican Party members of the United States House of Representatives from Iowa